Lichana is a town and commune in Biskra Province, Algeria. According to the 1998 census it has a population of 8,740.

Lichana is located in south-east Algeria, 360 km south of the capital Algiers, part of the Tolga Oasis, an area known internationally for high-quality dates (Deglet Nour) with more than 500,000 date palm trees in the area.

References

External links
Documentary about Lichana town :https://www.youtube.com/watch?v=W3AVO9-GIUI

Communes of Biskra Province
Cities in Algeria
Algeria